State Route 294 (SR 294) is a north–south secondary state highway in eastern Middle Tennessee.

Route description 
SR 294 begins on the east side of Livingston, in Overton County. It runs concurrently with SR 111 from the city limits to just short of Monroe, where SR 294 turns onto Willow Grove Highway. SR 294’s northern terminus is located outside of the parking lot of the Willow Grove Resort, a lodging establishment along the shores of Dale Hollow Lake. This is located in the one area of dry land in Clay County that can only be accessed from Overton County.

Major intersections

References 

294
294
294